Gurov is a Russian masculine surname, its feminine counterpart is Gurova. It may refer to:

 Alexander Gurov (politician) (born 1945), Russian politician
 Alexander Gurov (boxer) (born 1971), Ukrainian cruiserweight boxer
Andrey Gurov (born 1975), Kazakhstani sport shooter
Anna Gurova (born 1981), Russian sprinter
 Kirill Gurov (1918–1994), Russian theoretical physicist 
Maria Gurova (born 1989), Russian freestyle wrestler
Maxim Gourov (born 1979), Kazakhstani road bicycle racer
Natalya Gurova (born 1976), Kazakhstani sports shooter
Viktoriya Valyukevich (née Gurova in 1982), Russian triple jumper

See also
Gyurov
Gjurov

Russian-language surnames